This is a list of the 6 members of the European Parliament for Luxembourg in the 2009 to 2014 session.


List

Party representation

Notes

External links
2009 election results

Luxembourg 2009-2014
List
2009